The Beni Ahsen is an Arabian Moroccan tribe which belongs to the bigger Maqil tribe.

History 
The tribe settled in Morocco, north-Africa in the 12th century. Around the 16th century, they moved to the Missour and Almis area. In the 17th century, they advanced towards the northwest of the Sefrou region, in order to reach the Mamora forest and the plain of the Gharb. In the 18th century they were pushed more westwards by the Zemmour tribe, which moved up from the south. Today they are located in the region stretching from Salé to Sidi Slimane.

See also other tribe 
 Beni Amir
 Beni guil
 Rhamna
 Sless
 Sefiane
 Beni Hassan

See also 
 Arab
 Arab tribes
 Morocco
 Rabat
 North African Arabs

References

Arab tribes in Morocco